Oakes may refer to:
Oakes (surname)
Oakes, Huddersfield, England
Oakes, North Dakota, US

See also
 Oakes test, a legal analysis used in Canada to determine under what situations infringements on rights and freedoms are justifiable
 R. v. Oakes, a 1986 decision of the Supreme Court of Canada that established the Oakes test
Oaks (disambiguation)